Renato Mambor (4 December 1936 – 6 December 2014) was an Italian painter, writer, photographer and actor.

Born in Rome, Mambor was a member of the  1960s artistic movement known as the Scuola di Piazza del Popolo together with Mario Schifano, Pino Pascali and  Jannis Kounellis, among others. He is considered the founder of the "Conceptual Neo-Figuration" movement (Italian: Neofigurazione Concettuale). His artistic interests included photography, performance art and installation art. He was also active in cinema as a writer, a poster designer and character actor.

References

External links
 

1936 births
2014 deaths
Painters from Rome
Male actors from Rome
20th-century Italian painters
Italian male painters
21st-century Italian painters
Italian male film actors
20th-century Italian male actors
Photographers from Rome
Italian contemporary artists
20th-century Italian male artists
21st-century Italian male artists